Katharina Holzinger (born 1957) is a German political scientist with a focus on international politics. Since 2021, she is the Rector of the University of Konstanz.

Academic career 
Holzinger studied political science, German studies and philosophy in Munich before earning her doctorate at the University of Augsburg in 1993. From 1993 to 1997 she was a senior researcher at the Berlin Social Science Center (WZB) before joining the Max Planck Institute for Research on Collective Goods in Bonn. In 2002 she completed her habilitation (postdoctoral qualification) at the University of Bamberg. After a research stay as a Jean Monnet Fellow at the European University Institute in Florence (Italy) in 2002/2003, she was appointed as C4-professor for political science at University of Hamburg in 2004.

After joining the University of Konstanz in 2007 as a W3-professor for international politics in the Department of Politics and Public Administration, she was Vice Rector for International Affairs and Equal Opportunities from 2009 to 2012, and Vice Dean of the Faculty of Politics, Law and Economics from 2018 to 2020. She was involved in various capacities in the second round of the Excellence Initiative as well as the Excellence Strategy competition.
On 9 December 2020, Katharina Holzinger was elected to succeed Kerstin Krieglstein as Rector of the University of Konstanz.

Research interests 
Holzinger's research priorities include national international environmental policy; the European Union; theories of political decision-making; internal conflict, conflict management, bargaining and arguing; as well as traditional forms of governance. She is a principal investigator of the Konstanz Cluster of Excellence "The Politics of Inequality" and was a member of the Cluster of Excellence "Cultural Foundations of Integration" (2007–2019) and the Graduate School "Decision Science" (2013–2019). 
In 2012 she acquired funding for the Reinhart Koselleck Project "Traditional Governance and Modern Statehood: the Consequences of their Integration on Democracy and Domestic Conflict" of the German Research Foundation (DFG). From 2018 to 2020 she was involved in the establishment of the "Maria Sibylla Merian Institute for Advanced Studies in Africa", funded by the German Federal Ministry of Education and Research.

In 2007 Katharina Holzinger joined the University of Konstanz as a W3-professor for international politics in the Department of Politics and Public Administration. From 2009 to 2012, she held the position of Vice Rector for International Affairs and Equal Opportunities, and from 2018 to 2020, she was Vice Dean of the Faculty of Politics, Law and Economics. Professor Holzinger also took on various roles in the university's successful participation in second round of the German Excellence Initiative as well as the Excellence Strategy competition.

Awards 
In 2013 Holzinger was elected as a member of the Heidelberg Academy of Sciences (HdAW).

In 2018 she was elected as a member, and, in 2020, as board member of the Berlin-Brandenburg Academy of Sciences and Humanities (BBAW).

Publications (selection) 

 Traditional Political Institutions in Contemporary Politics (ed., with Kate Baldwin), Special Issue of Comparative Political Studies 52 (12), 2019, .
 Transnational Common Goods. Strategic Constellations, Collective Action Problems, and Multi-level Provision. Palgrave-Macmillan, New York 2008, .
 Environmental Policy Convergence in Europe? The Impact of International Institutions and Trade (with Christoph Knill and Bas Arts). Cambridge University Press, Cambridge 2008, .
 Die Europäische Union: Analysekonzepte und Theorien (with Frank Schimmelfennig, Berthold Rittberger, Christoph Knill, Dirk Peters, Wolfgang Wagner). Schöningh-UTB, Paderborn 2005, .

References

External links 
 Literature of and on Katharina Holzinger at Deutsche Nationalbibliothek
 Katharina Holzinger's website at the University of Konstanz
 

Living people
1957 births
German political scientists
Academic staff of the University of Konstanz
Women political scientists
University of Augsburg alumni
University of Bamberg alumni
Academic staff of the University of Hamburg
Place of birth missing (living people)